Two vessels of the United States Navy have borne the name USS Pintado, named in honor of the pintado.

  was a  commissioned in 1944 and struck in 1967.
  was a  commissioned in 1971 and struck in 1998.

United States Navy ship names